Stendy Appeltoft (27 November 1920 – 28 November 1992) was a Swedish footballer who played as a defender. He won one cap for the Sweden national team in 1955.

Club career 
Appeltoft played his club football for Högaborgs BK and Helsingborgs IF and appeared in a total of 382 games for Helsingborg.

International career 
Appeltoft made his only appearance for the Sweden national team on 28 August 1955 when he replaced Bengt Gustavsson in the 19th minute in a friendly game against Finland. At 34 years, 9 months and 1 day, he is the oldest debutante to ever appear for the Sweden national team. He also appeared once for the Sweden B team.

Career statistics

International

Honours 
Records
 Oldest debutante for the Sweden national team: 34 years, 9 months and 1 day (3–0 against Finland on 28 August 1955)

References 

Swedish footballers
Association football defenders
Sweden international footballers
Helsingborgs IF players

1920 births

1992 deaths